Air Marshal Sir Alan Lees,  (23 May 1895 – 14 August 1973) was a Royal Air Force officer who became Air Officer Commanding-in-Chief RAF Reserve Command.

RAF career
Educated at Wellington College and the Royal Military College, Sandhurst, Lees was commissioned into the Royal West Kent Regiment in 1914 at the start of the First World War. He became a pilot in 1915 and while serving on the Western Front was wounded and taken prisoner in 1917. After the War he transferred to the new Royal Air Force and in 1928 became Officer Commanding No. 56 Squadron. He was appointed Officer Commanding No. 1 (Indian Wing) Station in 1932, Station Commander at RAF Driffield in 1938 and then joined the staff at Headquarters RAF Bomber Command in 1939.

He served in the Second World War as Air Officer Commanding No. 2 Group from 1941, Air Officer Commanding No. 222 (General Reconnaissance) Group from 1942 and Air Officer Administration at Headquarters Air Command South East Asia from 1944. After the War he became Air Officer Commanding-in-Chief RAF Reserve Command before retiring in 1949. In that role he introduced a tie and trophy for members of the Air Training Corps.

References

 

|-

|-
 

1895 births
1973 deaths
People educated at Wellington College, Berkshire
Royal Air Force air marshals of World War II
Knights Commander of the Order of the Bath
Commanders of the Order of the British Empire
Companions of the Distinguished Service Order
Recipients of the Air Force Cross (United Kingdom)
Queen's Own Royal West Kent Regiment officers
Graduates of the Royal Military College, Sandhurst
Grand Officers of the Order of Orange-Nassau
British World War I prisoners of war
World War I prisoners of war held by Germany
British Army personnel of World War I
Military personnel from Lancashire